The  is a 1.5 km Japanese railway line in Nagoya, Aichi Prefecture, owned and operated by the private railway operator Nagoya Railroad (Meitetsu). At Meiden Chikkō, between the line's two stations, there is a connection to the freight-only Nagoya Rinkai Railway Tōchiku line.

Stations

History
The line was opened in 1924 by the Aichi Electric Railway, electrified at 1,500 V DC, to service the Nagoya Port. The company merged with Meitetsu in 1935. The line was double-tracked in 1939, but after being damaged by Typhoon Vera in 1959, the line was repaired as a single track.

References
This article incorporates material from the corresponding article in the Japanese Wikipedia.

Rail transport in Aichi Prefecture
Chikko Line
1067 mm gauge railways in Japan
Railway lines opened in 1924